The Aq Qoyunlu was a culturally Persianate, Sunni Turkoman tribal confederation. Founded in the Diyarbakir region by Qara Yuluk Uthman Beg, they ruled parts of present-day eastern Turkey from 1378 to 1503, and in their last decades also ruled Armenia, Azerbaijan, much of Iran, Iraq, and Oman where the ruler of Hormuz recognised Aq Qoyunlu suzerainty. The Aq Qoyunlu empire reached its zenith under Uzun Hasan.

History

Etymology 
The name Aq Qoyunlu, literally meaning "[those with] white sheep", is first mentioned in late 14th century sources. It has been suggested that this name refers to old totemic symbols, but according to Rashid al-Din Hamadani, the Turks were forbidden to eat the flesh of their totem-animals, and so this is unlikely given the importance of mutton in the diet of pastoral nomads. Another hypothesis is that the name refers to the predominant color of their flocks.

Origins 

According to chronicles from the Byzantine Empire, the Aq Qoyunlu are first attested in the district of Bayburt south of the Pontic Mountains from at least the 1340s. 
In these chronicles, Tur Ali Beg was mentioned as lord of the "Turks of Amid [Diyarbakir]", who had already attained the rank of amir under the Ilkhan Ghazan. Under his leadership, they besieged Trebizond, but failed to take the town. A number of their leaders, including the dynasty's founder, Qara Yuluk Uthman Beg, married Byzantine princesses.

By the end of the Ilkhanid period in the mid-14th century, the Oghuz tribes that comprised the Aq Qoyunlu confederation roamed the summer pastures in Armenia, in particular, the upper reaches of the Tigris river and winter pastures between the towns of Diyarbakır and Sivas. Since the end of the 14th century, Aq Qoyunlu waged constant wars with another tribal confederation of the Oghuz tribes, the Qara Qoyunlu. The leading Aq Qoyunlu tribe was the Bayandur tribe.

Uzun Hasan used to assert the claim that he was an "honorable descendant of Oghuz Khan and his grandson, Bayandur Khan". In a letter dating to the year 1470, which was sent to Şehzade Bayezid, the then-governor of Amasya, Uzun Hasan wrote that those from the Bayandur and Bayat tribes, as well as other tribes that belonged to the "Oghuz il", and formerly inhabited Mangyshlak, Khwarazm and Turkestan, came and served in his court. He also made the tamga (seal) of the Bayandur tribe the symbol of his state. For this reason, the Bayandur tamga is found in Aq Qoyunlu coins, their official documents, inscriptions and flags.

Myth
The Aq Qoyunlu Sultans claimed descent from Bayindir Khan, who was a grandson of Oghuz Khan, the legendary ancestor of Oghuz Turks.

According to Professor G. L. Lewis:

According to the Kitab-i Diyarbakriyya, the ancestors of Uzun Hasan back to the prophet Adam in the 68th generation are listed by name and information is given about them. Among them is Tur Ali Bey, the grandfather of Uzun Hasan's grandfather, who is also mentioned in other sources. But it is difficult to say whether Pehlivan Bey, Ezdi Bey and Idris Bey, who are listed in earlier periods, really existed. Most of the people who are listed as the ancestors of Uzun Hasan are names related to the Oghuz legend and to Oghuz rulers.

Uzun Hasan 

The Aq Qoyunlu Turkomans first acquired land in 1402, when Timur granted them all of Diyar Bakr in present-day Turkey. For a long time, the Aq Qoyunlu were unable to expand their territory, as the rival Qara Qoyunlu or "Black Sheep Turkomans" kept them at bay. However, this changed with the rule of Uzun Hasan, who defeated the Black Sheep Turkoman leader Jahān Shāh in 1467. After the death of Jahan Shah, his son Hasan Ali, with the help of Timurid Abu Sa'id Mirza, marched on Azerbaijan to meet Uzun Hasan. Deciding to spend the winter in Karabakh, Abu Sa'id was captured and repulsed by Uzun Hasan as the former advanced towards the Aras River.

After the defeat of a Timurid leader, Abu Sa'id Mirza, Uzun Hasan was able to take Baghdad along with territories around the Persian Gulf. He expanded into Iran as far east as Khorasan. However, around this time, the Ottoman Empire sought to expand eastwards, a serious threat that forced the Aq Qoyunlu into an alliance with the Karamanids of central Anatolia.

As early as 1464, Uzun Hasan had requested military aid from one of the Ottoman Empire's strongest enemies, Venice. Despite Venetian promises, this aid never arrived and, as a result, Uzun Hassan was defeated by the Ottomans at the Battle of Otlukbeli in 1473, though this did not destroy the Aq Qoyunlu.

In 1470, Uzun selected Abu Bakr Tihrani to compile a history of the Aq Qoyunlu confederation. The Kitab-i Diyarbakriyya, as it was called, referred to Uzun Hasan as sahib-qiran and was the first historical work to assign this title to a non-Timurid ruler.

Uzun Hasan preserved relationships with the members of the popular dervish order whose main inclinations were towards Shi'ism, while promoting the urban religious establishment with donations and confirmations of tax concessions or endowments, and ordering the pursuit of extremist Shiite and antinomist sects. He married one of his daughters to his nephew Haydar, the new head of the Safavid sect in Ardabil.

Sultan Ya'qub 

When Uzun Hasan died early in 1478, he was succeeded by his son Khalil Mirza, but the latter was defeated by a confederation under his younger brother Ya'qub at the battle of Khoy in July.

Ya'qub, who reigned from 1478 to 1490, sustained the dynasty for a while longer. However, during the first four years of his reign there were seven pretenders to the throne who had to be put down. Unlike his father, Ya'qub Beg was not interested in popular religious rites and alienated a large part of the people, especially the Turks. Therefore, the vast majority of Turks became involved in the Safawiya order, which became a militant organization with an extreme Shiite ideology led by Sheikh Haydar. Ya'qub initially sent Sheikh Haydar and his followers to a holy war against the Circassians, but soon decided to break the alliance because he feared the military power of Sheikh Haydar and his order. During his march to Georgia, Sheikh Haydar attacked one of Ya'qub's vassals, the Shirvanshahs, in revenge for his father, Sheikh Junayd (assassinated in 1460), and Ya'qub sent troops to the Shirvanshahs, who defeated and killed Haydar and captured his three sons. This event further strengthened the pro-Safavid feeling among Azerbaijani and Anatolian Turkmen.

Following Ya'qub's death, civil war again erupted, the Aq Qoyunlus destroyed themselves from within, and they ceased to be a threat to their neighbors.
The early Safavids, who were followers of the Safaviyya religious order, began to undermine the allegiance of the Aq Qoyunlu. The Safavids and the Aq Qoyunlu met in battle in the city of Nakhchivan in 1501 and the Safavid leader Ismail I forced the Aq Qoyunlu to withdraw.

In his retreat from the Safavids, the Aq Qoyunlu leader Alwand destroyed an autonomous state of the Aq Qoyunlu in Mardin. The last Aq Qoyunlu leader, Sultan Murad, brother of Alwand, was also defeated by the same Safavid leader. Though Murād briefly established himself in Baghdad in 1501, he soon withdrew back to Diyar Bakr, signaling the end of the Aq Qoyunlu rule.

Ahmad Beg 

Amidst the struggle for power between Uzun Hasan's grandsons Baysungur (son of Yaqub) and Rustam (son of Maqsud), their cousin Ahmed Bey appeared on the stage. Ahmed Bey was the son of Uzun Hasan's eldest son Ughurlu Muhammad, who, in 1475, escaped to the Ottoman Empire, where the sultan, Mehmed the Conqueror, received Uğurlu Muhammad with kindness and gave him his daughter in marriage, of whom Ahmed Bey was born.

Baysungur was dethroned in 1491 and expelled from Tabriz. He made several unsuccessful attempts to return before he was killed in 1493. Desiring to reconcile both his religious establishment and the famous Sufi order, Rustam (1478–1490) immediately allowed Sheikh Haydar Safavi's sons to return to Ardabil in 1492. Two years later, Ayba Sultan ordered their re-arrest, as their rise threatened the Ak Koyunlu again, but their youngest son, Ismail, then seven years old, fled and was hidden by supporters in Lahijan.

According to Hasan Rumlu's Ahsan al-tavarikh, in 1496–97, Hasan Ali Tarkhani went to the Ottoman Empire to tell Sultan Bayezid II that Azerbaijan and Persian Iraq were defenceless and suggested that Ahmed Bey, heir to that kingdom, should be sent there with Ottoman troops. Bayezid agreed to this idea, and by May 1497 Ahmad Bey faced Rustam near Araxes and defeated him.

After Ahmad's death, the Aq Qoyunlu became even more fragmented. The state was ruled by three sultans: Alvand Mirza in the west, Uzun Hasan's nephew Qasim in an enclave in Diyarbakir, and Alvand's brother Mohammad in Fars and Iraq-Ajam (killed by violence in the summer of 1500 and replaced by Morad Mirza). The collapse of the Aq Qoyunlu state in Iran began in the autumn of 1501 with the defeat at the hands of Ismail Safavi, who had left Lahija two years earlier and gathered a large audience of Turkmen warriors. He conquered Iraq-Ajami, Fars and Kerman in the summer of 1503, Diyarbakir in 1507–1508 and Mesopotamia in the autumn of 1508. The last Aq Qoyunlu sultan, Morad, who hoped to regain the throne with the help of Ottoman troops, was defeated and killed by Ismail's Qizilbash warriors in the last fortress of Rohada, ending the political rule of the Aq Qoyunlu dynasty.

Governance
The leaders of Aq Qoyunlu were from the Begundur or Bayandur clan of the Oghuz Turks and were considered descendants of the semi-mythical founding father of the Oghuz, Oghuz Khagan. The Bayandurs behaved like statesmen rather than warlords and gained the support of the merchant and feudal classes of Transcaucasia (present-day Armenia, Azerbaijan, and Georgia). The Aq Qoyunlu, along with the Qara Qoyunlu, were the last Iranian regimes that used their Chinggisid background to establish their legitimacy. Under Ya'qub Beg, the Chinggisid yasa (traditional nomadic laws of the medieval Turco-Mongols of the Eurasian steppe lands) was dissolved.

Uzun Hasan's conquest of most of mainland Iran shifted the seat of power to the east, where the Aq Qoyunlu adopted Iranian customs for administration and culture. In the Iranian areas, Uzun Hasan preserved the previous bureaucratic structure along with its secretaries, who belonged to families that had in a number of instances served under different dynasties for several generations. The four top civil posts of the Aq Qoyunlu were all occupied by Iranians, which under Uzun Hasan included; the vizier, who led the great council (divan); the mostawfi al-mamalek, high-ranking financial accountants; the mohrdar, who affixed the state seal; and the marakur "stable master", who supervised the royal court.

Culture flourished under the Aq Qoyunlu, who, although of coming from a Turkic background, sponsored Iranian culture. Uzun Hasan himself adopted it and ruled in the style of an Iranian king. Despite his Turkoman background, he was proud of being an Iranian. At his new capital, Tabriz, he managed a refined Persian court. There he utilized the trappings of pre-Islamic Persian royalty and bureaucrats taken from several earlier Iranian regimes. Through the use of his increasing revenue, Uzun Hasan was able to buy the approval of the ulama (clergy) and the mainly Iranian urban elite, while also taking care of the impoverished rural inhabitants.

In letters from the Ottoman Sultans, when addressing the kings of Aq Qoyunlu, such titles as  "King of Iranian Kings",  "Sultan of Iranian Sultans",  Shāhanshāh-e Irān Khadiv-e Ajam "Shahanshah of Iran and Ruler of Persia", Jamshid shawkat va Fereydun rāyat va Dārā derāyat "Powerful like Jamshid, flag of Fereydun and wise like Darius" have been used. Uzun Hassan also held the title Padishah-i Irān "Padishah of Iran", which was re-adopted by his distaff grandson Ismail I, founder of the Safavid Empire.

The Aq Qoyunlu realm was notable for being inhabited by many prominent figures, such as the poets Ali Qushji (died 1474), Baba Fighani Shirazi (died 1519), Ahli Shirazi (died 1535), the poet, scholar and Sufi Jami (died 1492) and the philosopher and theologian, Jalal al-Din Davani (died 1503).

Culture

The Aq Qoyunlu patronized Persian belles-lettres which included poets like Ahli Shirazi, Kamāl al-Dīn Banāʾī Haravī, Bābā Fighānī, and Shahīdī Qumī. By the reign of Yaʿqūb, the Aq Qoyunlu court held a fondness for Persian poetry.

Nur al-Din 'Abd al-Rahman Jami dedicated his poem, Salāmān va Absāl, which was written in Persian, to Yaʿqūb. Yaʿqūb rewarded Jami with a generous gift. Jami also wrote a eulogy, Silsilat al-zahab, which indirectly criticised Yaʿqūb immoral behavior. Yaʿqūb had Persian poems dedicated to him, including Ahli Shirazi's allegorical masnavi on love, Sham' va parvana and Bana'i's 5,000 verse narrative poem, Bahram va Bihruz.

Yaʿqūb's maternal nephew, 'Abd Allah Hatifi, wrote poetry for the five years he spent at the Aq Qoyunlu court.

Uzun Hasan and his son, Khalil, patronized, along with other prominent Sufis, members of the Kobrāvi and Neʿmatallāhi tariqats. According to the Tarikh-e lam-r-ye amini by Fazlallh b. Ruzbehn Khonji Esfahni, the court-commissioned history of Yaqub's reign, Uzun Hasan built close to 400 structures in the Aq Qoyunlu region for the purpose of Sufi communal retreat.

Administration 
The Aq Qoyunlu administration encompassed of two sections; the military caste, which mostly consisted of Turkomans, but also had Iranian tribesmen in it. The other section was the civil staff, which consisted of officials from established Persian families.

Military structure
The organization of the Aq Qoyunlu army was based on the fusion of military traditions from both nomadic and settled cultures. The ethnic background of Aq-Qoyunlu troops were quite heterogeneous as it consisted of 'sarvars' of Azerbaijan, people of Persia and Iraq, Iranzamin askers, dilavers of Kurdistan, Turkmen mekhtars and others.

Gallery

Coinage

See also

List of rulers of Aq Qoyunlu
Turkmen invasions of Georgia
Bozulus

Notes

References

Sources
 Bosworth, Clifford (1996) The New Islamic Dynasties: A Chronological and Genealogical Manual (2nd ed.) Columbia University Press, New York, 
 

 
 
 

 Morby, John (2002) Dynasties of the World: A Chronological and Genealogical Handbook (2nd ed.) Oxford University Press, Oxford, England, 

 Woods, John E. (1999) The Aqquyunlu: Clan, Confederation, Empire (2nd ed.) University of Utah Press, Salt Lake City, 

 
Medieval Azerbaijan
15th century in Armenia
Medieval Georgia (country)
Medieval Iranian Azerbaijan
States and territories established in 1378
1501 disestablishments in Asia
1378 establishments in Asia
Medieval Iraq
1370s in the Middle East